The Giro del Ticino was a professional one-day road cycling race held annually from 1949 to 1968 in the Canton of Ticino, Switzerland.

Winners

References

Cycle races in Switzerland
Recurring sporting events established in 1949
1949 establishments in Switzerland
Recurring sporting events disestablished in 1968
Defunct cycling races in Switzerland